Chinese ancestor veneration, also called Chinese ancestor worship, is an aspect of the Chinese traditional religion which revolves around the ritual celebration of the deified ancestors and tutelary deities of people with the same surname organised into lineage societies in ancestral shrines. Ancestors, their ghosts, or spirits, and gods are considered part of "this world". They are neither supernatural (in the sense of being outside nature) nor transcendent in the sense of being beyond nature. The ancestors are humans who have become godly beings, beings who keep their individual identities. For this reason, Chinese religion is founded on veneration of ancestors. Ancestors are believed to be a means of connection to the supreme power of Tian as they are considered embodiments or reproducers of the creative order of Heaven. It is a major aspect of Han Chinese religion, but the custom has also spread to ethnic minority groups.

Ancestor veneration is largely focused on male ancestors. Hence, it is also called Chinese patriarchal religion. It was believed that women did not pass down surnames because they were incapable of carrying down a bloodline. Chinese kinship traces ancestry through the male lineage that is recorded in genealogy books. They consider their ancestral home to be where their patriline ancestor was born (usually about five generations back) or the origin of their surname.

Confucian philosophy calls for paying respect to one's ancestors, an aspect of filial piety; Zhuo Xinping (2011) views traditional patriarchal religion as the religious organisation complementing the ideology of Confucianism. As the "bedrock faith of the Chinese", traditional patriarchal religion influences the religious psychology of all Chinese and has influenced the other religions of China, as it is evident in the worship of founders of temples and schools of thought in Taoism and Chinese Buddhism.

Ancestor veneration practices prevail in South China, where lineage bonds are stronger and the patrilineal hierarchy is not based upon seniority and access to corporate resources held by a lineage is based upon the equality of all the lines of descent; whereas in North China worship of communal deities is prevalent.

Definition

Some contemporary scholars in China have adopted the names "Chinese traditional patriarchal religion" ( Zhōngguó chuántǒng zōngfǎ xìng zōngjiào) or "Chinese traditional primordial religion" ( Zhōngguó chuántǒng yuánshēng xìng zōngjiào) to define the traditional religious system organised around the worship of ancestor-gods.

Mou Zhongjian defines "clan-based traditional patriarchal religion" as "an orthodox religion that was widely accepted by all classes, and had been practiced for thousands of years in ancient China". Mou also says that this religion was subordinate to the state, it was "diverse and inclusive" and had "a humanistic spirit that emphasises the social, moral function of religion", and is closely related to politics. It refers to:
«[...] The traditional religion that had been in place since the Xia, Shang, and Zhou dynasties. It evolved from the worship of Heaven and ancestors. It had the basic components of a religion, including religious concepts, emotions, and rituals. It had no independent organisation. Instead, it was the kinship structure that fulfilled the functions of religious organisation. The emperor, who was the son of God, was the representative of the people who worshiped Heaven. Elders of the clans and parents represented the family in the worship of ancestors. Respecting Heaven and honoring ancestors (jingtian fazu), taking good care in seeing off the deceased, and maintaining sacrifices to distant ancestors (shenzhong zhuiyuan) were the basic religious concepts and emotional expressions in this religion. [...]»

According to Zhuo Xinping (2011), Chinese patriarchal religion and Confucianism complemented each other in ancient China, as the Confucian religion traditionally lacked a social religious organisation while traditional patriarchal religion lacked an ideological doctrine.

Practices

In Chinese folk religion, a person is thought to have multiple souls, categorized as hun and po, commonly associated with yang and yin, respectively. Upon death, hun and po separate. Generally, the former ascends into heaven and the latter descends into the earth and/or resides within a spirit tablet; however, beliefs concerning the number and nature of souls vary. In accordance with these traditional beliefs, various practices have arisen to address the perceived needs of the deceased.

Mourning
The mourning of a loved one usually involves elaborate rituals, which vary according to region and sect. The intensity of the mourning is thought to reflect the quality of relationship one had with the deceased. From the time of Confucius until the 20th century, a three-year mourning period was often prescribed, mirroring the first three years in a child's life when they are utterly dependent upon and loved unconditionally by their parents. These mourning practices would often include wearing sackcloth or simple garb, leaving hair unkempt, eating a restricted diet of congee two times a day, living in a mourning shack placed beside the house, and moaning in pain at certain intervals of the day. It is said, that after the death of Confucius his followers engaged in this three-year mourning period to symbolize their commitment to his teachings.

Funeral rites

Funerals are considered to be a part of the normal process of family life, serving as a cornerstone in inter-generational traditions. The primary goals, regardless of religious beliefs, are to demonstrate obeisance and provide comfort for the deceased. Other goals include: to protect the descendants of the deceased from malevolent spirits and to ensure the proper separation and direction of the deceased's soul into the afterlife.

Some common elements of Chinese funerals include the expression of grief through prolonged, often exaggerated, wailing; the wearing of white mortuary clothes by the family of the deceased; a ritual washing of the corpse, followed by its attiring in grave clothes; the transfer of symbolic goods such as money and food from the living to the dead; the preparation and installation of a spirit tablet or the use of a personator, often symbolic. Sometimes, ritual specialists such as Taoist priests or Buddhist monks would be hired to perform specific rites, often accompanied by the playing of music or chanting of scripture to drive away evil spirits.

Burial

Burial is often delayed according to wealth; the coffin would remain in the main room of the family home until it has been properly prepared for burial. More traditionally, this delay is pre-determined according to social status: the corpse of a king or emperor would be held in abeyance for seven months; magnates, five; other officers, three; commoners, one.

In some instances, a "lucky burial" can take place several years after the burial. The bones are dug up, washed, dried, and stored in an earthenware jar. After a period of storage, the contents are then interred in their final resting place in a location selected by an augur to optimize the flow of qi. A bad qi flow could result in a disgruntled spirit who could possibly haunt their descendants.

The deceased would often be buried with sacrifices, typically things one was thought to be in need of in the afterlife. This was done as a symbolic demonstration of filial piety or grandeur. For the wealthy and powerful, bronze vessels, oracle bones, and human or animal sacrifices often accompanied the deceased into the grave. More common sacrifices included candles and incense, as well as offerings of wine and food.

Continued obeisance
After the funeral, families often install an ancestral tablet at a household altar alongside other deceased ancestors. This act symbolically unifies the ancestors and honors the family lineage. Incense is lit before the altar daily, significant announcements are made before them, and offerings such as favorite foods, beverages, and spirit money are given bi-monthly and on special occasions, such as during the Qingming Festival and Zhong Yuan Festival.

Prayer was usually performed at the household altar in a separate room containing the po of their ancestors. The eldest male would speak to the altar on a regular basis. In some belief systems where special powers are ascribed to the deceased, he may supplicate the spirit to bless the family.

Scholarly Commentary 

"In Song scholarship, the superstition of prophecy seems to be gone, but the divinity of God still exists, only the specific method used in honoring God is no longer to listen to the condemnation of heavenly will, but to insist on the cultivation of the mind of the moral subject."

"The whole social community can then be regarded as a religiously integrated structure; speaking of it as the real world, it happens to be an object of indoctrination of Confucian and Mencian ethics, with the sage as the ultimate of its meaning and imperial power as their institutional dependence."

Professor Mou Zhongjian and others have argued that, in addition to Taoism and Buddhism, there is "a large religion that has been universally accepted by society as the authentic faith and has lasted for thousands of years.

Religion and Humanism 
The contradiction and opposition between religion and humanism in Western history was resolved in China during the Zhou dynasty, after which there was no suppression of humanism by religion and no question of reviving ancient humanism.

Guo Yi, a researcher at the Institute of Philosophy, Chinese Academy of Social Sciences, says, "It is not that religion suppressed the humanist tradition, but that the supremacy of science and reason suppressed the humanist tradition. This, too, is very different from the West.

Because of this neglect of traditional Chinese patriarchal religious structures, "many Western writings on Chinese religion also seem to ignore these relational features of Confucianism, often focusing only on widely held beliefs about "gods, ghosts, and ancestors. When occasional attention is paid to "elite religion," it is only to cosmology and its abstract philosophy, not to the inner spiritual life of Confucians engaged in self-cultivation."

See also 

 Jongmyo (shrine)
 Religious Confucianism
 Sacrifice to Heaven
 Patriarchal System
 Chinese folk religion
 Unity of Heaven and humanity

References

Citations

Sources 

 
 
 
 
 
 
 Zhuo Xinping, "Spiritual Accomplishment in Confucianism and Spiritual Transcendence in Christianity," in 

Practices in Chinese folk religion
Buddhism in China
Shamanism in China
Veneration of the dead
Filial piety
Religious policy in China
Religious Confucianism